Russian Television and Radio Broadcasting Network (RTRN) is a unitary enterprise created on August 13, 2001, by decree of the president of the Russian Federation. The company is included in the list of Russian strategic enterprises.

RTRN operates Russia’s digital terrestrial television (DTT) network — the largest operating broadcasting network in the world. It consists of 5040 transmission sites and 10,080 transmitters. Almost 75% out of the 5040 transmission sites were built from scratch.

RTRN’s DTT services cover 98,4% of the Russian population. RTRN provides terrestrial transmission of 20 must-carry public television channels and three radio stations broadcasting over the territory of the Russian Federation. RTRN also serves other radio and television channels of both all-Russian and regional types distributing the programs of the latter. Multichannel terrestrial radio and television broadcasting in Russia is provided by 78 broadcasting centers functioning as RTRN regional branches. Moscow broadcasting signal reaches the regions through satellite and land communication channels.

RTRN was appointed to execute the deployment of the DTT network in the DVB-T2 standard according to the federal target programme “Development of TV and Radio Broadcasting in the Russian Federation in 2009-2018”.

RTRN is a member of DVB consortium, and was a member of the European Broadcasting Union (EBU) before withdrawal from the union in February 2022.

The Digital Switchover 
It took RTRN 10 years to move from analogue to digital broadcasting. The Digital Switchover (DSO) was completed in late 2019. On December 3, 2009, the Russian Government approved the federal target programme “Development of TV and Radio Broadcasting in the Russian Federation in 2009-2018”. The main objective of the programme was to provide the population of the Russian Federation with free-to-air multichannel digital TV and radio broadcasting.

Before 2010 almost half of Russia’s population, 44%, could watch no more than four channels. There was no room left for development of analogue broadcasting. Authorities have envisaged TV multiplexes in 2009. The list of channels in the first of the two of them was approved by a decree of the President of Russia.

Over a period of 10 years, about 100 million TV-sets and about 20 million digital set-top boxes were sold. This had set the stage for the analogue switch-off (ASO). On November 29, 2018, the Russian government approved the ASO roadmap. The federal target programme included modernizing the whole structure of terrestrial broadcasting. It is considered the biggest programme of digital TV development in the world.

In December 2018, the pilot region, the Tver Region, phased out analogue broadcasting of 20 federal TV channels. In 2019, Russia switched off analogue TV broadcasting in four stages: February 11 (8 regions), April 15 (20 regions), June 3 (36 regions) and October 14 (21 regions).

Russia was the first BRICS country to complete the ASO. Preparation for each stage of the ASO included a number of activities:

1. Informing the population, both through federal and regional media.

2. Placing information materials in post offices, social protection centres, retail appliances and electronics stores.

3. Door-to-door activities in all localities of the Russian Federation.

4. Attracting volunteers to assist the population in setting up equipment for receiving DTT. 70,000 volunteers, 30,000 social workers and 50,000 Russian Post employees participated in the process.

5. Creating the Digital Switchover Task Force with representatives of the Russian government, regional authorities and all organizations involved.

6. Monitoring the cost of the TV reception equipment in retail stores.

7. Carrying out inspection of сommunity antenna TV systems for DTT broadcasting in apartment buildings and, if necessary, repairing and upgrading them.

8. Developing mechanisms and conditions for providing the population living outside the DTT coverage area with satellite equipment at a reduced price.

9. Providing targeted assistance for vulnerable and/or low-income citizens.

A special digital terrestrial TV hotline has been opened in the run-up to the ASO. Operators consulted viewers on buying up-to-date DVB-T2 equipment and adjusting it to their conditions. RTRN staff tested equipment from the retail and informed viewers through the hotline about the best choices. 78 DTT Consultation Centers operated in administrative centers of Russian regions.

100% of the Russian population have got the guaranteed public access to 20 must-carry public TV channels and three radio stations, 98,4% of them — through DTT.

To complete the Digital Switchover RTRN collaborated with IT software manufacturers Nevion and Progira.

More than 11,000 analogue TV transmitters were put out of operation. The DTT transition has laid the foundations for the development of new services (HD, UHD, HbbTV and so on).

Participation in the national program “Digital Economy of the Russian Federation” and new telecom services implementation are RTRN’s main current objectives.

RTRN has successfully tested the main standards of digital broadcasting including DRM.

Unique TV towers 
The tallest TV tower in RTRN’s network is the Ostankino Tower in Moscow. Ostankino was designed by Nikolai Nikitin. It was erected in 1967. Ostankino was built to mark the 50th anniversary of the October Revolution. It is named after the surrounding Ostankino district of Moscow.

The tower is the tallest free-standing building in Russia and a symbol of Russian broadcasting. It is currently the tallest free-standing structure in Europe and 11th tallest in the world. Between 1967 and 1974, it was the tallest in the world. With 1,771 feet tall (540 m), Ostankino tower is one of the most famous landmarks of Moscow attracting thousands of tourists per year.

The TV tower is a member of the World Federation of Great Towers (WFGT).

The other concrete structure in RTRN’s network is Novorossiysk TV Tower. The tower is used for FM and TV transmission in Novorossiysk in Krasnodar Krai. It was completed in 1996 and is 261 metres tall.

Saint Petersburg Television Tower is the second-tallest tower after the concrete Ostankino Tower and the tallest lattice tower in Russia, possessing a total height of 326 m (1,070 ft).

It was the first dedicated television tower in the Soviet Union and now is utilized for transmitting for FM-/TV-broadcasting throughout the federal city.

The Saint Petersburg TV Tower ranks as the eleventh-tallest lattice tower in the world, the second-tallest television tower, and the tallest lattice television tower in the whole of the Russian Federation.

References

External links

 Official website 
  

Telecommunications companies of Russia
Federal State Unitary Enterprises of Russia
Companies based in Moscow